Bradley's Barn is the fifth studio album by American rock group The Beau Brummels. Released in October 1968, it contains the singles "Long Walking Down to Misery" and "Cherokee Girl." The album has received critical acclaim as an early example of country rock. Bradley's Barn is actually a recording studio in Nashville owned by Owen Bradley.

Recording

By 1968, bassist Ron Meagher had left the Beau Brummels after having been drafted into military service, reducing the band to a duo consisting of lead vocalist Sal Valentino and composer-guitarist Ron Elliott. They worked on a new album at Bradley's Barn, a recording studio in Wilson County, Tennessee, 
joined by prominent Nashville session musicians such as Kenny Buttrey, a drummer on Bob Dylan's albums from 1966–1969, and guitarist Jerry Reed. The Beau Brummels were so pleased with the results at the studio that they named the album Bradley's Barn. 
According to Elliott, the sound was not too different from the band's previous album, Triangle, just with more country accents.

The Beau Brummels split up shortly after the album was completed, though they would reunite briefly in 1975. The Everly Brothers covered album track "Turn Around" for their 1968 Roots album, on which Elliott worked as an arranger.

Track listing

2011 re-issue 
In June 2011, Bradley's Barn was re-issued by Rhino Handmade as a deluxe hardback set, expanded to two discs that include alternate takes, unreleased songs and an October 1968 radio interview with the two band members. This expanded edition was named one of the '10 Best Reissues of the Year' by Rolling Stone.

Personnel

 David Briggs – keyboards
 Kenny Buttrey – drums
 Ron Elliott – guitar, vocals
 Norbert Putnam – bass
 Jerry Reed – guitar
 Sal Valentino – vocals

References

External links
 [ Bradley's Barn] at Allmusic

1968 albums
Warner Records albums
The Beau Brummels albums
Albums produced by Lenny Waronker